The Venice project can refer to:
 The Venice Project - drama film directed by Robert Dornhelm
 Joost formerly code-named The Venice Project - peer-to-peer video distribution service (the new venture of Niklas Zennström and Janus Friis, founders of Skype)